Plinthina is a subgenus of Horse-fly in the tribe Scionini.

Species
Scaptia (Plinthina) arnhemensis Lessard, 2012
Scaptia (Plinthina) aurifulga Lessard, 2011
Scaptia (Plinthina) binotata Latreille, 1811
Scaptia (Plinthina) beyonceae Lessard, 2011

References

Tabanidae
Insect subgenera
Diptera of South America
Taxa named by Francis Walker (entomologist)